Čečina is a Serbian place name. It may refer to the following two settlements in Serbia:

Čečina, Ivanjica
Čečina, Doljevac

Serbo-Croatian place names